Apache Abdera is an implementation of the Atom Syndication Format and Atom Publishing Protocol, which are standards for creating, editing, and publishing web feeds and other web resources. The current focus is on a Java implementation, although C/C++ and .NET implementations are being considered.

The Abdera code was initially developed by IBM and donated to the Apache Software Foundation in June 2006.

Features
 Consumption and production of Atom 1.0 feed and entry documents
 Atom Publishing Protocol client implementation
 A framework for the creation of an Atom Publishing Protocol server
 XML Digital Signature and encryption of Atom documents
 Support for format and protocol extensions

References

External links

Abdera mailing list archives

Apache Software Foundation projects
Java (programming language) libraries